The Roman Catholic Diocese of Arauca is a diocese located in the city of Arauca in the Ecclesiastical province of Nueva Pamplona in Colombia.

History
26 May 1915: Established as Apostolic Prefecture of Arauca from the Apostolic Vicariate of Casanare
11 November 1970: Promoted as Apostolic Vicariate of Arauca
19 July 1984: Promoted as Diocese of Arauca

Leadership
Prefects Apostolic of Arauca
 Emilio Larquère, C.M. (January 1916 – 9 November 1923)
 Giuseppe Potier, C.M. (1924.05.07 – 1950)
 Graziano Martínez, C.M. (27 October 1950 – 1956)
 Vicars Apostolic of Arauca
 Jesús Emilio Jaramillo Monsalve, M.X.Y. (11 November 1970 – 19 July 1984)
Bishops of Arauca
 Rafael Arcadio Bernal Supelano, C.Ss.R. (29 March 1990 – 10 January 2003)
 Carlos Germán Mesa Ruiz (20 March 2003 – 22 March 2010)
 Jaime Muñoz Pedroza (4 December 2010 – 11 July 2018)
 Jaime Cristóbal Abril González (18 November 2019 – present)

See also
Roman Catholicism in Colombia

References

External links
 GCatholic.org

Roman Catholic dioceses in Colombia
Roman Catholic Ecclesiastical Province of Nueva Pamplona
Christian organizations established in 1915
Roman Catholic dioceses and prelatures established in the 20th century